Nia Faith Betty (born October 6, 2001) is a Canadian activist, fashion designer, and the co-founder of Révolutionnaire, a digital social network for changemakers and a clothing line to celebrate diversity.

In November 2019, in her first year at Howard University, Betty founded Révolutionnaire as a dance wear line catering to dancers of color, the first in Canada. Betty grew up in the professional ballet world and was considered a prodigy who moved to the United States to train at New York City's Joffrey Ballet School at the age of 14. During her time at Joffrey, Betty was featured in Awesomeness TV's Joffrey Elite. Two years later, in 2017, Betty suffered from a nearly career-ending injury that left her on bed rest for several months.

During her time on bed rest, Betty began sketching and designing a dancewear line catering to dancers of color, inspired by her own journey of growing up as a Black ballerina and never having access to apparel that matched her skin tone and having to dye her dancewear for the majority of her career. When Betty met Misty Copeland in 2014 and learned that Copeland also dyed her apparel and accessories due to a lack of diversity in dancewear, Betty became inspired to create her own.

In 2019, Betty began her first semester at historically black Howard University, in Washington, D.C. At Howard, Betty launched Révolutionnaire several weeks later at the age of 17 with a line of branded tee shirts which later expanded into Canada's first skin-toned dancewear and accessories for people of color.

In the summer of 2020, Betty entered a unique partnership with the Canadian Heritage brand Roots which included a two-part collaboration between Roots and Révolutionnaire taking part over eight months. The first phase of the collaboration launched on February 5, 2021, with Betty's sister being announced as co-founder of the company the same week. The collaboration featured a t-shirt with the phrase “Dreams Fuel Revolutions” on it and sold out in under 24 hours. Proceeds from the collection were donated to Canada's Black Academy to amplify young Black talent across the country. The second collaboration launched on October 19, 2021, with a leather jacket, leather bag, two statement t-shirts and six co-branded hoodies and sweatpants. In the midst of this, Betty launched an online platform for young people to engage in social change.

Activism 
As someone with a lifelong involvement in activism, Betty decided to expand her organization to be more social justice-focused. Betty worked with her sister and co-founder of Révolutionnaire, Justice Faith Betty to evolve Révolutionnaire with a social justice arm, creating a social network for activists. The sisters onboarded a team of over 30 young North American activists. The sisters along with their team worked to build out a dedicated platform for young people to learn about causes of interest, connect with like-minded citizens, and take action across social causes. Since launching in June 2021, the social network has gained members from Ghana, Uganda, Mexico, Turkey, Jordan, Canada, and the United States.

References 

 “Meet The 19-Year-Old Howard Student Behind Révolutionnaire, An Education And Action Platform For Young Activists” Essence. 3 June 2021.
 “Toronto sisters launch digital platform to help young activists make an impact” CBC. 8 July 2021.
 “These Toronto sisters created a platform for young activists to turn their dreams into action” Toronto Star. 23 March 2021.
 “The search for inclusive dancewear is over thanks to young Revolutionnaire changemakers” KGET. 23 June 2021.
 “HBCU STUDENT CREATES PLATFORM FOR YOUNG ACTIVISTS” YR Media. 4 June 2021.
 “Revolutionnaire: An Organizing Platform For Young Activists To Make The Impact They Want” Forbes. 17 June 2021
 “Révolutionnaire Helps Activists Get Educated and Connect” Cheddar. 2 June 2021.
 “Gen-Z social activists making a difference through their online platform” Your Basin. 31, July 2021.
 “Roots Is Celebrating Black History Month With A Limited Edition Collab” Style Democracy. 3 February 2021

2001 births
Living people
Canadian activists
Canadian fashion designers
Canadian women activists
Canadian women fashion designers
Black Canadian women
21st-century Canadian women